The Rockafellows Mill Bridge is a one-lane Pratt thru truss bridge that carries Rockafellows Mill Road over the South Branch Raritan River in Rockefellows Mills, Hunterdon County, New Jersey. The bridge was added to the National Register of Historic Places on January 26, 1990, as part of the Raritan–Readington South Branch Historic District.

History
The bridge was constructed in 1900 by the Wrought Iron Bridge Company of Canton, Ohio. In 2010, it was rehabilitated, while maintaining its historic structure.

Gallery

See also
 List of bridges on the National Register of Historic Places in New Jersey
 List of crossings of the Raritan River

References

External links
 

Raritan Township, New Jersey
Readington Township, New Jersey
Bridges over the Raritan River
Historic district contributing properties in New Jersey
Historic district contributing properties in Hunterdon County, New Jersey
National Register of Historic Places in Hunterdon County, New Jersey
Road bridges on the National Register of Historic Places in New Jersey
Pratt truss bridges in the United States
Bridges in Hunterdon County, New Jersey
Bridges completed in 1900